Manas Kumar Santra is an Indian cell biologist, biological chemist and a scientist at the National Centre for Cell Science (NCCS). He is known for his studies on F-box proteins which is the research focus of his laboratory at NCCS where he hosts a number of researchers.

Santra graduated in chemistry from Vidyasagar University in 1996 and earned a master's degree from the same institution in 1998. He moved to the Indian Institute of Technology, Mumbai from where he secured an MTech and a PhD in 2001 and 2006 respectively before doing his post-doctoral work at the University of Massachusetts Medical School during 2006–10. On his return to India, he joined the National Centre for Cell Science, Pune in 2010 and  holds the position of a Scientist D. He has published a number of articles, ResearchGate, an online repository of scientific articles has listed 57 of them. The Department of Biotechnology of the Government of India awarded him the National Bioscience Award for Career Development, one of the highest Indian science awards, for his contributions to biosciences, in 2017–18.

Selected bibliography

See also 

 Ligand
 Proteomics

Notes

References

External links 
 

Indian scientific authors
Year of birth missing (living people)
N-BIOS Prize recipients
Vidyasagar University alumni
IIT Bombay alumni
University of Massachusetts Medical School alumni
Indian cell biologists
Living people
Scientists from West Bengal